Alireza Nikmehr (born 1972 in Tabriz — died 2003 in Tabriz) was an Iranian footballer who played for Tractor as a  goalkeeper.

References

1972 births
2003 deaths
Sportspeople from Tabriz
Iranian footballers
Tractor S.C. players
Tabriz University of Medical Sciences alumni
Association football goalkeepers